Euspira nitida (common name : common necklace shell) is a species of sea snail, a marine gastropod mollusc in the family Naticidae, the moon snails.

Distribution
The common necklace shell is a common sea snail occurring in the sublittoral zone and deeper waters (exceptionally up to 2,000 m) along sandy coasts of the North Sea, from France to Norway, and the North East Atlantic (Iceland). It is also common in the Mediterranean Sea. It can be frequently found in great numbers washed ashore on beaches. It has been present in the North Sea since the Pliocene.

Description of the shell
The globular shell is rather small with a low spire : max. 16 mm high and 14 mm wide. The shell has a rather pointed apex. There are 5 to 6 gently convex whorls with an undeep suture. The body whorl is strongly rounded and covers almost the whole shell. The aperture is rather ovate and has a smooth outer lip. A siphonal canal is lacking. The umbilicus is partly covered with a callus. The horny operculum is composed of corneous material. The surface of the shell is smooth and shiny and lacks sculpture. Its color is a pale brown-yellow stained with orange to red-brown spots, arranged in four to five spiral lines. The shell of washed up specimens shows often a blue-black discoloration.

Taxonomy
Euspira nitida (Donovan, 1804) is the earliest available name for the common, shallow water, small-sized Euspira species that, in the Atlantic, has been called alderi, and in the Mediterranean has been called pulchella. Donovan's name was based on albino specimens of this species, which is why the name nitida has in the past been wrongly rejected by some authors as that of an "exotic" or "tropical" species.

There are many synonyms for this species 
 Euspira poliana (Delle Chiaje, 1826)
 Euspira pulchella (Risso, 1826)
 Lunatia alderi (Forbes, 1838)
 Lunatia intermedia (Philippi, 1836)
 Lunatia poliana (Della Chiaje, 1826)
 Lunatia pulchella (Risso, 1826)
 Lunatica nitida (Donovan, 1804)
 Natica alderi Forbes, 1838
 Natica alderi var. elata Bucquoy, Dautzenberg & Dollfus, 1883
 Natica alderi var. globulosa Bucquoy, Dautzenberg & Dollfus, 1883
 Natica alderi var. lactea Jeffreys, 1867
 Natica alderi var. subovalis Jeffreys, 1867
 Natica alderi var. ventricosa Jeffreys, 1867
 Natica complanata Locard, 1886
 Natica intermedia Philippi, 1836 (Invalid: junior homonym of Natica intermedia Deshayes, 1832)
 Natica neustriaca Locard, 1886
 Natica nitida (Donovan, 1804)
 Natica parvula Tapparone Canefri, 1869
 Natica poliana Delle Chiaje, 1826
 Natica pulchella Risso, 1826
 Nerita nitida Donovan, 1804 (original combination)
 Nerita poliana Delle Chiaje, 1830
 Polinices (Euspira) pulchellus (Risso, 1826)
 Polinices (Lunatia) alderi (Forbes, 1838)
 Polinices (Lunatia) intermedia (Philippi, 1836)
 Polinices (Lunatia) poliana (Delle Chiaje, 1826)
 Polinices alderi (Forbes, 1838)
 Polinices pulchella (Risso, 1826)

References

 Huelsken T., Marek K., Schreiber S., Schmidt I. & Hollmann M. (2008). The Naticidae (Mollusca: Gastropoda) of Giglio Island (Tuscany, Italy): Shell characters, live animals, and a molecular analysis of egg masses. Zootaxa 1770: 1-40

Sources
 Partly based on the Duch article : :nl:Glanzende tepelhoren

Further reading
  , 1962. British Prosobranch Molluscs. Adlard & Son Ltd, for Ray Society, London, 755 pp.
 , 1981. The prosobranch molluscs of Britain and Denmark, 6. - Cerithiacea, Strombacea, Hipponicacea, Calyptraeacea, Lamellariacea, Cypraeacea, Naticacea, Tonnacea, Heteropoda. Journal of Molluscan Studies, Supplement 9, pp. 285–363.
Gofas, S.; Le Renard, J.; Bouchet, P. (2001). Mollusca, in: Costello, M.J. et al. (Ed.) (2001). European register of marine species: a check-list of the marine species in Europe and a bibliography of guides to their identification. Collection Patrimoines Naturels, 50: pp. 180–213
 Muller, Y. (2004). Faune et flore du littoral du Nord, du Pas-de-Calais et de la Belgique: inventaire. [Coastal fauna and flora of the Nord, Pas-de-Calais and Belgium: inventory]. Commission Régionale de Biologie Région Nord Pas-de-Calais: France. 307 pp
 Huelsken T., Marek K., Schreiber S., Schmidt I. & Hollmann M. (2008). The Naticidae (Mollusca: Gastropoda) of Giglio Island (Tuscany, Italy): Shell characters, live animals, and a molecular analysis of egg masses. Zootaxa 1770: 1-40
 de Bruyne, R.H.; Bank, R.A.; Adema, J.P.H.M.; Perk, F.A. (1994). Nederlandse naamlijst van de weekdieren (Mollusca) van Nederland en Belgie: feestuitgave ter gelegenheid van het zestig-jarig jubileum van de Nederlandse Malacologische Vereniging [Dutch namelist of the Mollusca from the Netherlands and Belgium: festive edition at the occasion of the 60-year jubilee of the Dutch Malacological Society]. Backhuys Publishers: Leiden, The Netherlands. . 149 pp.

External links
 http://www.marbef.org/data/aphia.php?p=taxdetails&id=140539
  Donovan E. (1799-1804). The natural history of British shells: including figures and descriptions of all the species hitherto discovered in Great Britain, systematically arranged in the Linnean manner, with scientific and general observations on each. 5 volumes, London, printed for the Author, and for F. and C. Rivington, 180 plates with unpaginated text. Vol. 1: introduction 3 pp; pl. 1-18 [1799; pl. 19-36; index 10 pp. [1800] . Vol. 2: pl. 37-54 [1800]; pl. 55-72, index 10 pp. [1801]. Vol. 3: pl. 73-90 [1801]; pl. 91-108, index 8 pp. [1802]; Vol. 4: pl. 109-126 [1802]; pl. 127-144, index 8 pp [1803]. Vol. 5: pl. 145-162 [1803]; pl.163-180, index 7 pp. [1804 ]
 Risso, A. (1826-1827). Histoire naturelle des principales productions de l'Europe Méridionale et particulièrement de celles des environs de Nice et des Alpes Maritimes. Paris, Levrault:. . 3(XVI): 1-480, 14 pls
 Forbes, E. (1838). Malacologia Monensis: a catalogue of the Mollusca inhabiting the Isle of Man and the neighbouring sea. Edinburgh: J. Carfrae and son pp. XII + 63 + 3 pl
 Philippi, R. A. (1836). Enumeratio molluscorum Siciliae cum viventium tum in tellure tertiaria fossilium, quae in itinere suo observavit. Vol. 1. I-XIV, 1-303, Tab. XIII-XXVIII. Schropp, Berlin
 Locard A. (1886). Prodrome de malacologie française. Catalogue général des mollusques vivants de France. Mollusque marins. Lyon, H. Georg & Paris, Baillière : pp. X + 778
 Delle Chiaje S. (1823-1831). Memorie sulla storia e notomia degli animali senza vertebre del regno di Napoli. Napoli: Fratelli Fernandes (vol. 1), and Società Tipografica (vol. 2-4). Vol. 1, pp. i-xii, 1-84 [1823, pp. 1-184 [1824]; vol. 2, pp. [1-4] + 185-224 [1825], pp. 225-444 [1826]; vol. 3, pp. i-xx, pp. 1-232 [1828]; vol. 4, pp. i-vii [1831], 1-116 [1830], pp. 117-214 [1831]; pl. 1-4; pl. 1-69 [date?], pl. 70-109 ]
 Bucquoy E., Dautzenberg P. & Dollfus G. (1882-1886). Les mollusques marins du Roussillon. Tome Ier. Gastropodes. Paris: Baillière & fils. 570 pp., 66 pls. [pp. 1-84, pls 1-10, 1882; pp. 85-196, pls 11-20, 1883; pp. 197-342, pls 21-40, 1884; pp. 343-418, pls 41-50, 1885; pp. 419-570, pls 51-66
 Jeffreys J.G. (1862-1869). British conchology. Vol. 1: pp. cxiv + 341 [1862. Vol. 2: pp. 479 [1864]. Vol. 3: pp. 394 [1865]. Vol. 4: pp. 487 [1867]. Vol. 5: pp. 259 [1869]. London, van Voorst.]

Naticidae
Gastropods described in 1804